Jelše is a small settlement in the Municipality of Mirna Peč in southeastern Slovenia. It lies on the left bank of the Temenica River near where it reemerges from its underground course, just north of Mirna Peč. The railway line from Ljubljana to Novo Mesto runs just east of the settlement. The area is part of the historical region of Lower Carniola and is now included in the Southeast Slovenia Statistical Region.

References

External links
Jelše on Geopedia

Populated places in the Municipality of Mirna Peč